Dogstar is an American alternative rock group. They were initially active from the mid-1990s to the early 2000s, during which time the band found moderate success but garnered significant media attention due to the band's bassist being Hollywood actor Keanu Reeves.

Inception and name origin 
The genesis of Dogstar was a chance encounter between Robert Mailhouse and Keanu Reeves in a supermarket in 1991. Mailhouse was wearing a Detroit Red Wings hockey sweater, and Reeves (an avid hockey fan and a keen player of the sport) asked if Mailhouse needed a goalie. As the two men formed a friendship, they began jamming together, and were joined by Gregg Miller as the original lead guitarist and singer in 1992. Reeves said that one thing led to another in the band's history:

The band originally called themselves Small Fecal Matter, and then BFS (Big Fucking Shit, or Big Fucking Sound), before settling on Dogstar, after Mailhouse found the name in the book Sexus, written by Henry Miller.

Band history

1994–1999: Quattro Formaggi, Our Little Visionary and live performances 
Dogstar was joined by Bret Domrose as an additional vocalist and guitarist in 1994. One year later, the band toured extensively throughout the U.S. and Asia, and opened for David Bowie at his 1995 Hollywood Palladium gig, where they covered a song by Pink Floyd, as well as for Bon Jovi on his 1995 These Days - Crossroads Tour in Australia and New Zealand. Miller however left the band at the end of the tour. With Quattro Formaggi, they released their first sound carrier in the form of a four-track EP in 1996, via Zoo Entertainment, and followed this up with their debut album, Our Little Visionary, which was only distributed in Japan, even though Dogstar already had a worldwide fanbase at the time. The band also performed at the Zee Cine Awards in India, the 1996 Zwemdokrock Festival in Lummen, Belgium, and the 1999 Glastonbury Festival in Pilton, Somerset, England.

1999–2002: Happy Ending, breakup and post-Dogstar 
Although the band members had other work commitments, a second album, Happy Ending, followed in 1999, produced by Michael Vail Blum and Richie Zito. Domrose called the music on this record more "pop-aggressive" than the band's earlier work. Their last performance was in October 2002 in Japan, and the band broke up afterwards. Domrose went on to perform as a solo artist, briefly played guitar with the band Berlin and is currently writing music for film and television. Reeves and Mailhouse later performed together in a band called "becky".

Members

Keanu Reeves 
Reeves was the bassist and backing vocalist of Dogstar and one of the two founding members. He is mostly known for his work as an actor in major Hollywood productions. In the end, he left the band to further pursue his acting career and meet his working schedule.

Robert Mailhouse 
Mailhouse was Dogstar's drummer / percussionist and the other of the two founding members. Like Reeves, Mailhouse has an acting career, but mostly for television productions, and has appeared in the NBC soap opera Days of Our Lives, as well as the comedy series Seinfeld.

Gregg Miller 
Miller joined Dogstar a year after Mailhouse's and Reeves first encounter as their leading guitarist and vocalist. He participated on the band's 1995 tour before leaving the band.

Bret Domrose 
Domrose joined in 1994 as an additional guitarist and vocalist. After Miller's departure from the band, he took the lead guitar and vocals position.

Appearances and influences 
The band appeared in the 1999 road drama Me and Will, as well as the 2005 comedy-drama Ellie Parker.

Dogstar had several opening acts that went on to become notable, such as Rancid and Weezer (the latter's first gig was opening for Dogstar).

Discography

EPs 
1996: Quattro Formaggi (Zoo Entertainment)

Albums 
1996: Our Little Visionary (Zoo Entertainment)
2000: Happy Ending (Ultimatum Music)

Other 
 2004: "Shine" on the Mr. Big tribute album Influences & Connections - Volume One: Mr. Big ("Shine" originally appeared on the Mr. Big album Actual Size)

References

External links 
Dogstar on Myspace

Alternative rock groups from California
American post-grunge musical groups
American musical trios
Musical groups established in 1991
Musical groups disestablished in 2002
Zoo Entertainment (record label) artists